Knut Hartwig (born 13 November 1969) is retired a German football midfielder. Hartwig portrayed Fritz Walter in the movie The Miracle of Bern.

Career statistics

Personal life
Knut Hartwig is the father of Luis Hartwig.

References

External links
 
 

1969 births
Living people
German footballers
VfL Bochum II players
Wuppertaler SV players
SC Preußen Münster players
Rot-Weiss Essen players
2. Bundesliga players
Sportspeople from Münster
Association football midfielders
Footballers from North Rhine-Westphalia